Canyon Creek is an unincorporated community and census-designated place (CDP) in Hood County, Texas, United States. The population was 916 at the 2010 census. It is part of the Granbury micropolitan area as well as the Dallas–Fort Worth metroplex.

Geography
Canyon Creek is in southeastern Hood County, on the south side of Lake Granbury, a reservoir on the Brazos River.

References

Granbury micropolitan area
Census-designated places in Hood County, Texas
Census-designated places in Texas
Unincorporated communities in Hood County, Texas
Unincorporated communities in Texas